Face down ass up may refer to:

 Doggy style
 Face Down, Ass Up, a 2000 album by Andrew Dice Clay
 A song on the album Banned in the U.S.A. by 2 Live Crew